Sardehat-e Bayat Jafar (also Romanized as Sardehāt-e Bayāt Ja‘far; also known as Sardehāt, Sardehāt-e Ja‘far, Sardehāt-e Pā’īn, Sardehāt Ja‘far, and Sardekhat) is a village in Zanjanrud-e Pain Rural District, Zanjanrud District, Zanjan County, Zanjan Province, Iran. At the 2006 census, its population was 234, in 52 families.

References 

Populated places in Zanjan County